Lady on the Bus is a 1978 Brazilian erotic drama film written and directed by Neville de Almeida, based on the short story of the same name by Nelson Rodrigues.

Plot
Solange and Carlos have known each other since childhood and their marriage is arranged. On their wedding night, the inexperienced Solange resists her husband, who grows frustrated and impatient. Carlos ultimately forces himself on her and commits rape. Solange is traumatized and despite loving Carlos, wants nothing to do with him anymore. Solange tries to overcome her sexual dysfunction by having sex with strangers she picks up on buses.

Cast
 Sônia Braga as Solange
 Nuno Leal Maia as Carlos
 Jorge Dória as Father Carlos
 Paulo César Pereio as Assumption/Asunção
 Cláudio Marzo as psychoanalyst
 Márcia Rodrigues
 Paulo Villaça as Loafer
 Roberto Bonfim as Cod
 Rodolfo Arena
 Ney Santanna
 Ivan Setta as Mosquito
 Washington Fernandes

External links
 
 
 

1978 films
1978 drama films
1970s erotic drama films
1970s Portuguese-language films
Adultery in films
Brazilian erotic drama films
Films based on short fiction